P. microspora can refer to a few different species of fungi.  The specific epithet  means 'tiny spore.'

 Panaeolus papilionaceus var. microspora, a synonym for Panaeolus papilionaceus, the petticoat mottlegill
 Pestalotiopsis microspora, a fungus that can eat plastic
 Phaeoramularia microspora, a fungus in the genus Phaeoramularia
 Pholiota microspora, or nameko, a choice edible mushroom
 Phoma microspora, a fungal pathogen of peanuts.
 Poria microspora, a synonym for Rhodonia placenta, a crust fungus
 Puccinia microspora, a fungus in the genus Puccinia and a pathogen of cereal crops
 Pyxidiophora microspora, an arthropod-associated fungus in the genus Pyxidiophora
 Pyxine microspora, a lichen in the genus Pyxine

See also
 Microspora, a genus of green algae
 Psilocybe semilanceata var. microspora, a synonym for Psilocybe strictipes, a psilocybin mushroom